Claude Kalombo Tshidibi (born 31 March 1993 in Tembisa) is a South African rugby union player. His regular position is flanker.

Career

Youth

He represented Potchefstroom-based side  in various youth tournaments, playing for them in the 2006 Under-13 Craven Week and 2009 Under-16 Grant Khomo Week tournaments, as well as in the Under-18 Craven Week competition in both 2010 and 2011.

Golden Lions

Eastern Province Kings

References

South African rugby union players
Living people
1993 births
People from Tembisa
Golden Lions players
Rugby union players from Gauteng
Rugby union flankers